Ludlow Village Historic District may refer to:

Ludlow Village Historic District (Ludlow, Massachusetts), listed on the NRHP in Massachusetts
Ludlow Village Historic District (Ludlow, Vermont), listed on the NRHP in Vermont